Catafimbria is a genus of beetle in the family Cerambycidae. Its only species is Catafimbria boliviana. It was described by Belon in 1896.

References

Pteropliini
Beetles described in 1896